Mahamaya Prasad Sinha (1 May 1909 – 1987) was an Indian politician. He was the fifth Chief Minister of Bihar from March 1967 to January 1968 which was the first non congress Government in Bihar. Sinha was a follower of Maharaja Kamakhya Narain Singh and Maharaj Kumar Basant Narain Singh and was a member of their political Jan Kranti Dal. He was elected to the 6th Lok Sabha, lower house of the Parliament of India from the Patna constituency of Bihar in 1977. Before quitting  Congress, he was among the four prominent leaders of Bihar unit during 1960s, the others being Krishna Ballabh Sahay, Satyendra Narayan Sinha and Binodanand Jha.

Early life
Mahamaya Prasad was born in 1909. He sprang from a very aristocratic Kayastha family of Siwan district in Bihar. His academic career was marked by brilliance and popularity. He was in the public gaze as an athlete.

Political career
In 1929 he was to go to the I.C.S but joined the Civil Disobedience Movement. He was appointed the Dictator of the District and imprisoned for one year. Again he was arrested and sentenced to seven months imprisonment. In the prison he had a heat stroke and completely lost his voice.

Since 1931 he was a member of the A.I.C.C. for many years and became the President of the District Congress Committee. He was a very prominent political worker of Bihar. He was an able organizer and a gifted writer. Said Babu Rajender Prasad, "Mr Sinha is a most powerful speaker and one of the best workers of the province and is just like a son to me".

References

External links
 Biography: Mahamaya Prasad Sinha, Kamat Research Database
Official biographical sketch in Parliament of India website

Chief Ministers of Bihar
India MPs 1977–1979
1909 births
Year of death missing
Lok Sabha members from Bihar
Politicians from Patna
Bihar MLAs 1967–1969
Indian National Congress politicians from Bihar
Bharatiya Lok Dal politicians
Janata Party politicians